This article is an incomplete list of noted modern-era (20th to 21st century) Islamic scholars. This refers to religious authorities whose publications or statements are accepted as pronouncements on religion by their respective communities and adherents.

Geographical categories have been created based on commonalities in culture and across the Islamic World.

Africa

Nigeria

 Aminu Ibrahim Daurawa (born 1969)
 Dahiru Usman Bauchi (born 1927)
 Isa Ali Pantami
 Ja'afar Mahmud Adam (1960–2007)
 Kabiru Gombe (born 1960)
 Muhammad Auwal Albani Zaria (1960–2014)
 Sani Umar Rijiyar Lemo (born 1970)
 Sani Yahaya Jingir

Egypt 
 Abd al-Hamid Kishk (1933–1996)
 Ahmad al-Tayyeb (born 1946)
 Ahmad Muhammad Shakir (1892–1958)
 Ali Gomaa (born 1952)
 Muhammad Metwalli al-Sha'rawi (1911–1998)
 Muhammad Sayyid Tantawy (1928–2010)
 Yusuf al-Qaradawi (1926–2022)
 Zainab al Ghazali (1917–2005)

Mauritania 
 Abdallah Bin Bayyah (born 1935)

South Africa 
Abdalqadir as-Sufi (1930–2021)
 Ebrahim Desai (1963–2021)
 Taha Karaan (1969–2021)
 Yusuf Karaan (1935–2015)

Zimbabwe 
 Ismail ibn Musa Menk (born 1975)

Ghana 
 Ahmed Tijani Ben Omar (born 1950) 
 Osman Nuhu Sharubutu (born 1919)

Senegal 
Ibrahim Niass (1900–1975)

Morocco 
 Abd al-Aziz al-Ghumari (1920-1997)
 Asma Lamrabet (Born 1951)
 Fatima al-Kabbaj (born 1932)
 Muhammad Abu Khubza (1932-2020)

Asia

West Asia

Iran 
 Abd al-A'la al-Sabziwari (1910–1993)
 Abdollah Javadi-Amoli (born 1933)
 Ahmad Jannati (born 1927)
 Ahmad Mojtahedi Tehrani (1923–2008)
 Ali Akbar Ghoreishi (born 1928)
 Ali Mohammad Dastgheib Shirazi (born 1935)
 Ali Movahedi-Kermani (born 1931)
 Ali Khamenei (born 1939)
 Fakhraddin Mousavi (born 1930)
 Hassan Hassanzadeh Amoli (born 1928)
 Hossein Mazaheri (born 1933)
 Hossein Wahid Khorasani (born 1921)
 Hussein-Ali Montazeri (1922–2009)
 Iftikhār al-Tujjar (1912-1977)
 Ja'far Sobhani (born 1929)
 Jawad Tabrizi (1926–2006)
 Lotfollah Safi Golpaygani (born 1919)
 Mohammad Ali Gerami Qomi (born 1938)
 Mohammad Ali Mousavi Jazayeri (born 1941)
 Mohammad Ebrahim Jannaati (born 1933)
 Mohammad Kazem Shariatmadari (1904–1986)
 Mohammad Khamenei (born 1935)
 Muhammad Husayn Tabatabai (1903–1981)
 Mohammad Sadeq Rouhani (born 1926)
 Mohammad Sadeqi Tehrani (1926–2011)
 Mohammad Sadoughi (1909–1982)
 Mohammad Taghi Mesbah Yazdi (1935–2021)
 Mohammad-Taqi Bahjat Foumani (1916–2009)
 Mohammad Yazdi (1931–2020)
 Mousa Shubairi Zanjani (born 1928)
 Naser Makarem Shirazi (born 1927)
 Ruhollah Khomeini (1900–1989)
 Taqi Tabatabaei Qomi (1923–2016)
 Yasubedin Rastegar Jooybari (born 1940) 
 Yousef Saanei (1937–2020) 
 Zīnah al-Sādāt Humāyūnī (born 1917)
 Zohreh Sefati (born 1948)

Cyprus
 Nazim Al-Haqqani (1922–2014)

Iraq
 Abbas Modaresi Yazdi (1943–2020)
 Abu al-Qasim al-Khoei (1899–1992)
 Ahmad Hassani Baghdadi (born 1945)
 Ali al-Milani (born 1948)
 Ali al-Sistani (born 1930)
 Allaedin Ghoraifi (born 1945)
 Fazel Maleki (born 1953)
 Hassan al-Shirazi (1935–1980)
 Hussein Esmaeel al-Sadr (born 1952)
 Kamal al-Haydari (born 1956)
 Kazem al-Haeri (born 1938)
 Mahmoud al-Sarkhi (born 1964)
 Mohammad al-Sadr (1943–1999)
 Mohammad al-Shirazi (1928–2001)
 Mohammad Ali Tabatabaei Hassani (1945–2017)
 Mohammad Hussaini Shahroudi (1925–2019)
 Mohammed Ridha al-Shirazi (1959–2008)
 Mohammad Taher Khaqani (born 1940)
 Mohammad Taqi al-Modarresi (born 1945)
 Mohammad Yaqoobi (born 1960)
 Morteza Hosseini Fayaz (1929–2014)
 Muhammad Baqir al-Sadr (1935–1980)
 Sadiq al-Shirazi (born 1942)
 Shamsodin Vaezi (born 1936)
 Shahab ud-Din Mar'ashi Najafi (1897–1990)

Jordan
 Umar Sulayman al-Ashqar (1930–2012)
 Sa'id Foudah (born 1967)
 Nuh Ha Mim Keller (born 1954)
 Abdul Karim Khasawneh (born 1944)
 Nuh al-Qudah (born 1939)

Lebanon
 Abdullah al-Harari (1910–2008)
 Gibril Haddad (born 1960)
 Hisham Kabbani (born 1945)
 Mohammad Hussein Fadlallah (1935–2010)
 Musa al-Sadr (1928–1978)
 Sobhi Mahmassani (1909–1986)

Oman
 Zohurul Hoque (1926–2017)

Palestine
 Taqiuddin al-Nabhani (1909–1977)

Saudi Arabia
 Abd al-Aziz ibn Abd Allah ibn Baaz (1910–1999)
 Abdul Rahman Al-Sudais (born 1960)
 Abdul-Azeez ibn Abdullaah Aal ash-Shaikh (born 1943)
 Abdullah Ibn Jibreen (1933–2009)
 Adil al-Kalbani (born 1959)
 Ali Bin Abdur Rahman Al Huthaify (born 1947)
 Muhammad ibn Alawi al-Maliki (1944-2004)
 Muhammad Al-Munajid (born 1960)
 Muhammad ibn al Uthaymeen (1925–2001)
 Muhammad Muhsin Khan (born 1927)
 Rabee al-Madkhali (born 1931)
 Saleh Al-Fawzan (born 1933)
 Saud Al-Shuraim (born 1964)

Syria
 Ahmed Kuftaro (1915–2004)
 Muhammad Ali al-Sabuni (1930-2021)
 Muhammad al-Yaqoubi (born 1963)
 Muhammad bin Yahya al-Ninowy (born 1966)
 Muhammad Nasiruddin al-Albani (1914–1999)
 Muhammad Said Ramadan al-Bouti (1929–2013)
 Munira al-Qubaysi (born 1933)

Turkey
 Ahmet Mahmut Ünlü (born 1965)
 Ali Bardakoğlu (born 1952)
 Ali Erbaş (born 1961)
 Cemalnur Sargut (born 1962)
 Fethullah Gülen (born 1941)
 Hidayet Şefkatli Tuksal (born 1963)
 Hüseyin Hilmi Işık (1911-2001)
 Mahmud Esad Coşan (1938–2001)
 Mahmut Ustaosmanoğlu (1929-2022)
 Mehmed Fatih Çıtlak (born 1967)
 Mehmet Görmez (born 1959)
 Mustafa Çağrıcı (born 1950)
 Muzaffer Ozak (1916–1985)
 Nazim Al-Haqqani (1922–2014)
 Osman Nuri Topbaş (born 1942)
 Ömer Tuğrul İnançer (1946-2022)
 Süleyman Ateş (born 1933)
 Yaşar Nuri Öztürk (1951-2016)

Yemen
 Abdul Majeed al-Zindani (born 1942)
 Habib Ali al-Jifri (born 1971)
 Habib Umar bin Hafiz (born 1963)
 Muqbil bin Hadi al-Wadi'i (1933–2001)
 Yahya al-Hajuri

South Asia

Bangladesh
 Abdul Latif Chowdhury Fultali (1913–2008) 
 Abdul Halim Bukhari (born 1945) 
 Abdul Hamid Khan Bhashani (1880–1976)
 Abdul Haque Faridi (1903–1996)
 Abdul Jabbar Jahanabadi (1937–2016)
 Abdul Khaleque Mondal (born 1944)
 Abdul Malek Halim
 Abdul Matin Chowdhury (1915–1990)
 Abdur Rahim (1918–1987)
 Abdur Rahman Chatgami (1920–2015)
 Abdur Rahman Kashgarhi (d. 1971)
 Abdus Salam Chatgami (1943–2021)
 Abdus Sobhan (1936–2020)
 Abu Zafar Mohammad Saleh (1915–1990)
 A F M Khalid Hossain (born 1959)
 Ahmed Ali Enayetpuri (1898–1959)
 Ashraf Ali Bishwanathi (1928–2005)
 Athar Ali Bengali (1891–1976)
 Azizul Haq (1903–1961)
 Azizul Haque (1919–2012)
 Deen Muhammad Khan (1900–1974)
 Delwar Hossain Sayeedi (born 1940)
 Farid Uddin Chowdhury (b. 1947)
 Farid Uddin Masood (b. 1950)
 Fazlul Karim (1935–2006)
 Fazlul Haque Amini (1945–2012)
 Gulamur Rahman (1865–1937)
 Hafezzi Huzur (1895–1997)
 Ibrahim Chatuli (1894–1984)
 Ibrahim Ujani (1863–1943)
 Izharul Islam
 Junaid Babunagari (1955–2021)
 Khandaker Abdullah Jahangir (1961–2016)
 Khwaja Yunus Ali (1886–1951)
 Mahfuzul Haque (born 1969)
 Mahmudul Hasan (born 1950)
 Mamunul Haque (born 1973)
 Mohammad Akram Khan (1868–1969)
 Muhammad Abdul Malek (born 1969)
 Muhammad Asadullah Al-Ghalib (born 1948)
 Muhammad Faizullah (1892–1976)
 Muhammad Shahidullah (1885–1969)
 Muhammad Wakkas (1952–2021)
 Muhibbullah Babunagari (born 1935)
 Muhiuddin Khan (1935–2016)
 Mushahid Ahmad Bayampuri (1907–1971)
 Nur Hossain Kasemi (1945–2020)
 Nur Uddin Gohorpuri (1924–2005)
 Nurul Islam Farooqi (died 2014)
 Nurul Islam Jihadi (born 1948)
 Nurul Islam Olipuri (born 1955)
 Obaidul Haque (1934–2008)
 Obaidullah Hamzah (born 1972)
 Ruhul Amin (b. 1962)
 Sayed Muhammad Amimul Ehasan Barkati (1911–1974)
 Syed Najibul Bashar Maizbhandari (b. 1959)
 Syed Rashid Ahmed Jaunpuri (1889–2001)
 Sajidur Rahman (b. 1964)
 Sayed Kamaluddin Zafree (born 1945)
 Shah Ahmad Hasan (1882–1967)
 Shah Ahmad Shafi (1916–2020)
 Shahidul Islam (born 1960)
 Shahinur Pasha Chowdhury (b. 1985)
 Shamsul Haque Faridpuri (1896–1969)
 Shamsul Huda Panchbagi (1897–1988)
 Sultan Zauq Nadvi (born 1939)
 Syed Fazlul Karim (1935–2006)
 Syed Mohammad Saifur Rahman (born 1916)
 Syed Rezaul Karim (born 1971)
 Ubaidul Haq (1928–2007)
 Zia Uddin (born 1941)

India
 Abdul Ghani Azhari (1922–2023)
 Abdul Hamid Qadri Badayuni (1898–1970)
 Abdul Haq Azmi (1928–2016)
 Abdul Jalil Choudhury (1925-1989)
 Abdul Khaliq Sambhali (1950–2021)
 Abdul Rashid Dawoodi (born 1979) 
 Abdul Razzaq (1932–2021)
 Anzar Shah Kashmiri (1927–2008)
 Ameen Mian Qaudri
 Ahmed Raza Khan Barelvi (1856 - 1921)
 Atiqur Rahman Usmani (1901–1984) 
 Bashir al-Najafi (born 1942)
 Bashir-ud-din Farooqi (1934–2019) 
 E. K. Aboobacker Musliyar (1914–1996)
 Faizul Waheed (1966–2021)
 Fuzail Ahmad Nasiri (born 1978)
 Habibur Rahman Khairabadi (born 1933)
 Hafizur Rahman Wasif Dehlavi (1910–1987)
 Hamid al-Ansari Ghazi (1909–1992)
 Hashmi Miya (born 1947)
 Kafilur Rahman Nishat Usmani (1942–2006)
 Kalbe Abid (1923–1986)
 Kalbe Sadiq (1939–2020)
 Kanniyath Ahmed Musliyar (1900–1993)
 Kanthapuram A. P. Aboobacker Musliyar (born 1931)
 Khalid Saifullah Rahmani (born 1956)
 Mohammad Najeeb Qasmi
 Muhammad Salim Qasmi (1926–2018)
 Muhammad Sufyan Qasmi (born 1954)
 Muhammad Taqi Amini (1926–1991)
 Muhammad Yunus Jaunpuri (1937–2017)
 Minnatullah Rahmani (1913–1991)
 Mufti Syed Ziauddin Naqshbandi
 Muhammad Madni Ashraf Ashrafi Al-Jilani (born 1938)
 Mujahidul Islam Qasmi (1936–2002)
 Mustafa Raza Khan Qadri
 Nazir Ahmad Qasmi (born 20 June 1964)
 Nizamuddin Asir Adrawi (1926–2021)
 Noor Alam Khalil Amini (1952–2021)
 Qamaruzzaman Azmi
 Rafiq Ahmad Pampori (born 1956)
 Rahmatullah Mir Qasmi (born 1956)
 Saeed Ahmad Akbarabadi (1908–1985)
 Sa'id Akhtar Rizvi  (1927–2002)
 Salman Mazahiri (1946–2020)
 Sayyid Abdurahman Imbichikoya Thangal Al-Aydarusi Al-Azhari (1924–2015)
 Sayyid Ibraheem Khaleel Al Bukhari (born 1964)
 Shihabuddeen Ahmed Koya Shaliyathi
 Shakir Ali Noori
 Shams Naved Usmani (1931–1993)
 Syed Ahmad Hashmi (1932–2001)
 Syed Aqeel-ul-Gharavi (born 1964)
 Syed Hamidul Hasan
 Syed Mohammed Mukhtar Ashraf (1916-1996)
 Syed Muhammedali Shihab Thangal (1936–2009)
 Syed Zafrul Hasan Rizvi (1911–1983)
 Usman Mansoorpuri (1944–2021)
 Wahiduddin Khan (1925–2021)
 Yasin Mazhar Siddiqi (1944–2020) 
 Zayn al-Abidin Sajjad Meerthi (1910–1991)
 Zeeshan Haider Jawadi (1938–2000)
 Ziauddin Madani
 Ziaul Mustafa Razvi Qadri

Pakistan
 Abdur Razzaq Iskander (1935–2021)
 Abu Salman Shahjahanpuri (1940–2021)
 Abu Yahya (born 1969)
 Abdul Sattar Khan Niazi (1915–2001)
 Alauddin Siddiqui (1936–2017) 
 Amin Ahsan Islahi (1904–1997)
 Ameer Muhammad Akram Awan (1934–2017)
 Ehsan Elahi Zaheer (1940-1987)
 Fateh Muhammad Panipati (1905–1987)
 Ghulam Ali Okarvi (1919–2000)
 Ghulam Ahmed Perwez (1903–1985)
 Ghulam Mohi-ud-Din Ghaznavi (1902–1975) 
 Hakeem Muhammad Akhtar (1928–2013)
 Ilyas Qadri (12 July 1950)
 Israr Ahmed (1932–2010)
 Javed Ahmad Ghamidi (born 1952)
 Khadim Hussain Rizvi  (1966-2020)
 Khalid Masud (1935–2003)
 Khurshid Ahmad (born 1932)
 Muhammad Adil Khan (died 2020)
 Muhammad Ali Mirza (born 1977)
 Muhammad Hanif Nadvi (1908 – 1987)
 Muhammad Ishaq Madni (1935-28 August 2013)
 Muhammad Rafi Usmani (1936–2022)
 Muhammad Raza Saqib Mustafai (born 1972)
 Muhammad Tahir-ul-Qadri (born 1951)
 Muhammad Taqi Usmani (born 1949)
 Muneeb-ur-Rehman (born 1945)
 Nizamuddin Shamzai (12 July 1952 – 30 May 2004)
 Rasheed Turabi (1908–1973)
 Shah Ahmad Noorani (1926–2003)
 Shah Turab ul Haq (1944–2016)
 Syed Adnan Kakakhail (born 1975)
 Syed Jawad Naqvi (born 1952)
 Syed Shehanshah Hussain Naqvi (born 1974)
 Syed Shujaat Ali Qadri (1941–1993)
 Talib Jauhari (1939–2020)
 Tariq Jamil (born 1953)
 Tariq Masood (born 1975)
 Uzair Gul Peshawari (died 17 November 1989)
 Zar Wali Khan (1953–2020)
 Muhammad Ilyas Attar Qadri (Born 1950)

Bangladesh
 Delwar Hossain Sayeedi (Born Feb, 1940)

Indonesia
 Abdurrahman Wahid (1940–2009)
 B.J. Habibie (1936-2019)
 Fakih Usman (1904–1968)
 Hamka (1908–1981)
 Ilyas Ruhiat (1934–2007)
 Maria Ulfah (born 1955)
 Mas Mansoer (1896–1946)
 Mohammad Natsir (1908–1993)
 Quraish Shihab (born 1944)
 Siti Noordjannah Djohantini (born 1958)
 Siti Chamamah Soeratno (born 1941)

Malaysia
 Abdul Hadi Awang (born 1947)
 Asri Zainul Abidin (born 1971)
 Haron Din (1940–2016)
 Nenney Shushaidah Binti Shamsuddin (born 1975)
 Nik Abdul Aziz Nik Mat (1931–2015)
 Syed Muhammad Naquib al-Attas (born 1931)
 Zailan Morris
 Zulkifli Mohamad Al-Bakri (born 1969)

Central Asia

Uzbekistan
 Muhammad Sadik Muhammad Yusuf (1952–2015)

East Asia

China
 Du Shuzhen (born 1924)
 Muhammad Ma Jian (1906–1978)

Europe

The Balkans
 Abdul Qader Arnaoot (1928–2004) Kosovo
 Muhammad Nasiruddin al-Albani (1914–1999) Albania
 Mustafa Cerić (born 1952) Bosnia and Herzegovina
 Shefqet Krasniqi (born 1966) Kosovo
 Shuaib Al Arna'ut (1928-2016) Albania
 Vehbi Sulejman Gavoçi (1923-2013) Albania

Western Europe

Austria
 Adnan Ibrahim (born 1966) Vienna
 Muhammad Asad (1900–1992)

Germany
 Ahmad Milad Karimi (born 1979)
Halima Krausen (born 1949)

Ireland
 Umar Al-Qadri (born 1982) Dublin

United Kingdom
 Abdul Qayum (born 1960) London
 Abdur Rahman ibn Yusuf Mangera (born 1974)
 Abu-Abdullah Adelabu London
 Abu Yusuf Riyadh ul Haq (born 1971) Leicester
 Ajmal Masroor (born 1971) London
 Ahmed Saad Al-Azhari (born 1978) London
 Haifaa Jawad Birmingham
 Haitham al-Haddad (born 1971) London
 Ibrahim Mogra (born 1965) Leicester
 Joel Hayward (born 1964) London
 Khurshid Ahmad (scholar) (born 1932) Leicester
 Martin Lings (1909–2005) Manchester
 Mohammad Akram Nadwi (born 1964) Oxford
 Muhammad Abdul Bari (born 1953) London
 Muhammad ibn Adam Al-Kawthari, Leicester
 Musharraf Hussain (born 1962) Nottingham
 Nahiem Ajmal (born 1979)
 Ruqaiyyah Waris Maqsood (born 1942) London
 Shabbir Akhtar (born 1960) Bradford
 Timothy Winter (born 1960) London
 Yasser Al-Habib (born 1979)
 Yusuf Motala (1946–2019) Lancashire

Switzerland
 Frithjof Schuon (1907–1998)
 Tariq Ramadan (born 1962) Geneva

North America

Canada
 Ahmad Kutty (born 1946), Toronto
 Faraz Rabbani, Ontario

Farhat Hashmi (born 1957)

 Ingrid Mattson (born 1963), Ontario
 Jamal Badawi, Halifax, Nova Scotia
 Muzaffar Iqbal (born 1954), Edmonton
 Reza Hosseini Nassab (born 1960), Toronto

United States
 
 Aminah McCloud (born 1958)
 Amina Wadud (born 1952)
 Amir Hussain Los Angeles, CA
 Asifa Quraishi
 Asma Barlas (born 1950)
 Azizah Y. Al-Hibri (born 1943) Virginia
 Caner Dagli 
 Dalia Mogahed
 Fazlur Rahman (1919–1988) Illinois
 Fetullah Gulen (born 1941) Pennsylvania
 Hamza Yusuf (born 1958) Berkeley, CA
 Hamid Algar (born 1940) Berkeley, CA
 Hassan Hathout (1924–2009) Pasadena. CA
 Jonathan A.C. Brown (born 1977) Washington DC
 Kecia Ali (born 1972) Massachusetts
 Khaled Abou El Fadl (born 1963) California
 Khalid Yahya Blankinship (born 1949) Philadelphia, PA
 Laleh Bakhtiar (1938-2020)
 Louay Safi (born 1955)
 Maria Massi Dakake (born 1968)
 Mohammed Adam El-Sheikh (born 1945) Virginia
 Mohammad Hassan Khalil Michigan
 Muqtedar Khan (born 1966) Delaware
 Muzammil H. Siddiqi (born 1943)
 Omar Khalidi (1953–2010)
 Omar Suleiman Texas
 Omid Safi North Carolina
 Ovamir Anjum Ohio
 Riffat Hassan (born 1953)
 Seyyed Hossein Nasr (born 1933)
 Sherman Jackson California
 Umar Faruq Abd-Allah (born 1948) Chicago
 Wael Hallaq (born 1955) New York
 Warith Deen Mohammed (1933–2008) Illinois
 Yasir Qadhi (born 1975) Texas
 Yasir Nadeem al Wajidi (born 1982) Chicago
 Zaid Shakir (born 1956) California

Trinidad
 Imran N. Hosein

Oceania

Australia 
 Charis Waddy (1909–2004)
 Fehmi Naji (1928–2016) 
 Ibrahim Abu Mohamed 
 Taj El-Din Hilaly (born 1941)

New Zealand 
 Joel Hayward (born in Christchurch in 1964), lives in Abu Dhabi, UAE

See also
 Allamah
 Education in Islam
 Islamic studies by author (non-Muslim or academic)
 Islamic studies
 List of Da'ees
 List of female Islamic scholars
 List of Islamic historians
 List of Islamic jurists
 List of Islamic philosophers
 List of Muslim astronomers
 List of Muslim mathematicians
 List of Muslim scientists
 List of contemporary Sufi scholars

References

 
Lists of scholars and academics
Lists of theologians and religious studies scholars
Islam-related lists